Ronald Dennis Kadziel (born February 27, 1949) is a former American football linebacker in the National Football League for the New England Patriots. He played college football at Stanford University.

Early years
Kadziel attended Pomona Catholic High School, where he practiced football and baseball. He was drafted as a catcher by the Minnesota Twins after graduation, but turned down the signing bonus to play college football.

He accepted a football scholarship from Stanford University. He was a backup tight end as a sophomore and junior.

As a senior, he was converted into a linebacker. He became a starter, posting 56 tackles and 2 interceptions, even though he was limited with a pulled thigh muscle that he suffered in mid-season.

Professional career
Kadziel was selected by the Dallas Cowboys in the 5th round (129th overall) of the 1971 NFL Draft. He was waived on September 7.

On March 8, 1972, he signed as a free agent with the New England Patriots. He started the season opener at weakside linebacker against the Cincinnati Bengals, but was demoted afterwards in favor of Ron Acks. On July 23, 1973, he announced his retirement from professional football.

References

1949 births
Living people
Sportspeople from Pomona, California
Players of American football from California
American football linebackers
Stanford Cardinal football players
New England Patriots players